Khlebnikov, Khlebnikova or Klebnikov is a Russian surname, meaning a maker of bread (khleb), may refer to:

People
Aleksandr Khlebnikov (born 1984), Russian football player
Paul Klebnikov (1963–2004), American journalist and historian
Sergey Khlebnikov (1955–1999), Russian Olympic speed skater 
Valery Khlebnikov (born 1981), Russian ice hockey player
Velimir Khlebnikov (1885–1922), Russian poet and playwright
Marina Khlebnikova (born 1965), Russian singer and actress, winner of a Golden Gramophone Award

Other
Khlebnikov (firm), Russian jewelry firm, founded in 1867
Kapitan Khlebnikov (icebreaker), Russian icebreaker

See also
Khlebnikovo